The Ngoma Awards are an annual Zambian arts award ceremony which recognise the nation's artistic talent.  The awards are organised by the National Arts Council of Zambia.  The Ngoma Awards are Zambia's only official national artistic honours and awards, covering a wide range of disciplines.

History
The National Arts Council of Zambia is mandated by the National Arts Council Act 31 of 1994 Part 5, Section (e) to “regulate and provide for modalities for the award of national honours for artistic merit.”

In 2019, the Ngoma Awards returned to Zambia after a 6 year hiatus.  The newly relaunched Ngoma Awards includes 7 categories: creative writing, stage theatre, community theatre, music, traditional music and dance, visual arts, and media arts. Guidelines and Procedures for the Ngoma Awards are provided in booklet and PDF form by the National Arts Council of Zambia.

2019 winners
Ngoma Award winners were announced in December 2019.

Music

Visual Arts

Media Arts

Creative Writing

Theatre

References 

 Ngoma Awards 2019: Guidelines and Procedures for the Ngoma Awards
 Vice President Lupando Mwape honored, Zana, 4 December 2004
 Matongo Maumbi, 2005 2005 Ngoma Awards Ceremonies a Disgrace, Lyrics Africa, 6 December 2005

External links
 National Arts Council of Zambia

African music awards